Yanesha' (Yaneshac̈h/Yanešač̣; literally 'we the people'), also called Amuesha or Amoesha is a language spoken by the Amuesha people of Peru in central and eastern Pasco Region.

Due to the influence and domination of the Inca Empire, Yanesha' has many loanwords from Quechua, including some core vocabulary.  Yanesha' may also have been influenced by Quechua's vowel system so that, today, it has a three-vowel system rather than a four-vowel one that is typical of related Arawakan languages. There are also many loanwords from Kampa languages.

Phonology
Yanesha' has 26 consonants and 9 vowel phonemes. The consonants have a certain degree of allophonic variation while that of the vowels is more considerable.

Consonants

 is an allophone of  before 

Yanesha', similar to languages like Russian, Irish, and Marshallese, makes contrasts between certain pairs of palatalized and plain consonants:

 anap̃  ('he answered him') vs. anap  ('he answered')
 esho'ta netsorram̃o  ('entered my saw') vs. esho'ta nenamo  ('entered my mouth')
 ña  ('he') vs. na  ('I')

The bilabial palatalized consonants have a more perceptible palatal offglide than the alveolar ones.

Another general feature of Yanesha' is devoicing in certain contexts. In addition to the devoicing of palatal offglides above, the retroflex fricative  is voiceless when word final (final devoicing) or before a voiceless consonant (regressive assimilation): arrpa  ('here it is') → .

The velar fricative  is debuccalized to  before another consonant.

Vowels

Laryngealization generally consists of glottalization of the vowel in question, creating a kind of creaky voice. In pre-final contexts, a variation occurs—especially before voiced consonants—ranging from creaky phonation throughout the vowel to a sequence of a vowel, glottal stop, and a slightly rearticulated vowel: ma'ñorr  ('deer') → .  Before a word-final nasal, this rearticulated vowel may be realized as a syllabic quality of said nasal.  Also, although not as long as a phonemically long vowel, laryngeal vowels are generally longer than short ones.  When absolutely word-final, laryngealized vowels differ from short ones only by the presence of a following glottal stop.

Each vowel varies in its phonetic qualities, having contextual allophones as well as phones in free variation with each other:

 is the short phoneme consisting of phones that are front and close to close-mid. Generally, it is realized as close  when following bilabial consonants.

Laryngeal  consists of the same variation and allophony of the short phoneme with the minor exception that it is more likely to be realized as close following  as in pe'sherr  ('parakeet') →  'parakeet'

 is the short phoneme consisting of phones that are central. Its most frequent realization is that of an open central unrounded vowel  (represented hereafter without the centralizing diacritic). While the laryngeal counterpart is qualitatively identical to the short, the long counterpart, differs only in that  is not a potential realization.

 is the short phoneme consisting of phones that are back as well as rounded.

Phonotactics

All consonants appear initially, medially, and finally with the exception that  and  do not occur word-finally. With two exceptions ( and ), initial clusters include at least one stop. The other possible initial clusters are:

Word final clusters consist of either a nasal or  followed by a plosive or affricate: 

Medial clusters may be of two or three consonants.

Stress

Although apparently phonemic, stress tends to occur on the penultimate syllable but also in the ultimate.  Less frequently, it is antepenultimate.  Some words, like oc̈hen''  ('comb'), have stress in free variation.

Lexicography
A Yanesha' Talking Dictionary was produced by Living Tongues Institute for Endangered Languages.

References

 
 

Arawakan languages
Indigenous languages of the Andes
Languages of Peru